Diamond Lake is a glacial-origin lake in the village of Mundelein in northeastern Lake County, Illinois. Diamond Lake's water is replenished by precipitation and runoff within its watershed. Water exits the lake via a drainage pipe that eventually connects to the Des Plaines River.

History

The Mundelein Park District gained ownership of the majority of the lake in the 1960s.

Wildlife
Diamond Lake is home to several species of flora and fauna. The most common aquatic plants found in the lake include coontail, sago pondweed, and the invasive Eurasian watermilfoil and curly-leaf pondweed. In 2008, the following thirteen species of fish were identified in the lake: bluegill, pumpkinseed, largemouth bass, yellow bass, yellow perch, black crappie, walleye, northern pike, channel catfish, Eurasian carp, golden shiner, emerald shiner, and American gizzard shad.

In 2008, invasive zebra mussels were first sighted in Diamond Lake. 

Common loons and American white pelicans can be sighted at the lake during their annual migrations. Canada geese, mallards, and great blue herons are common residents, and bald eagles are often seen flying over the lake. Muskrats, red foxes, and painted turtles also live in or around Diamond Lake.

Residents living near the lake founded the Diamond Lake Preservation Association in 2014. The group's mission is the maintain the health and usability of Diamond Lake by effectively managing its invasive species.

References 

Mundelein, Illinois
Diamond (Illinois)